The following is a list of 2019 UCI Women's Teams and riders for the 2019 women's road cycling season.

Riders

Alé–Cipollini

Aromitalia–Basso Bikes–Vaiano

Astana Women's Team

.

Bepink

Biehler Pro Cycling

Bigla Pro Cycling

Bizkaia–Durango

Boels–Dolmans

BTC City Ljubljana

Canyon–SRAM

CCC Liv

Charente–Maritime Women Cycling

China Liv Pro Cycling

Cogeas–Mettler–Look

Conceria Zabri–Fanini

Doltcini–Van Eyck Sport UCI Women Cycling

Drops Cycling Team

Eneicat Cycling Team

Eurotarget–Bianchi–Vittoria

FDJ Nouvelle-Aquitaine Futuroscope

Hagens Berman–Supermint

Health Mate–Cyclelive Team

Hitec Products–Birk Sport

Lotto–Soudal Ladies

Lviv Cycling Team women

Massi–Tactic Women Team

Minsk Cycling Club

Mitchelton–Scott

Movistar Team

Parkhotel Valkenburg Cycling Team

Rally UHC Cycling

Servetto–Piumate–Beltrami TSA

Sho-Air TWENTY20

Sopela Women's Team

Swapit–Agolico

Team Illuminate

Team Sunweb

Tibco–Silicon Valley Bank

Team Virtu Cycling Women

Thailand Women's Cycling Team

Top Girls Fassa Bortolo

Trek–Segafredo

Valcar–Cylance

WNT–Rotor Pro Cycling

References

2019